Kireedam is a 2007 Indian Tamil-language action drama film directed by A. L. Vijay in his directorial debut. The film is a remake of the 1989 Malayalam film of the same name. It stars Ajith Kumar, Trisha and Rajkiran, while Vivek, Saranya, Ajay, and Santhanam appear in supporting roles. The film's score and soundtrack are composed by G. V. Prakash Kumar, while Tirru was the cinematographer. The film opened on 20 July 2007 to positive reviews and became a hit at the box office. It was dubbed into Telugu as Poorna Market.

Plot 
Sakthivel (Ajith Kumar) is an implicitly obedient son of a sincere policeman Rajarajan (Rajkiran). Sakthi and his father share the same dream: that of seeing him enter the police force. The entire family comprising two other daughters, the mother (Saranya), and a wastrel of a brother-in-law (Vivek) are cuddly and close-knit. Rajarajan is from the old school of life, and honesty is his watchword. In a venal system, this lands him in trouble often. Divya (Trisha) is a charming college student. She has some comical run-ins with Sakthi and eventually falls in love with him. Elsewhere, Rajarajan, who books an MLA’s son for an offence, is hauled up over the coals and sent on a ‘punishment transfer’ to a place, which is run as personal fief by a local dada Varadarajan (Ajay). One thing leads to another, and Sakthi is unwittingly sucked into the unholy vortex. Just as he is about to join the police force, destiny decrees otherwise: his life is not going to be the same again. A father’s dream lies shattered while a son, despite his unwillingness, has to fight an honest war beyond the matrix of a law. It is a situation that is actually an emotional cauldron. How the father and son reconcile to the new reality is the story.

Cast 

Ajith Kumar  as Sakthivel
Trisha as Divya
Rajkiran as Rajarajan, Sakthivel's father
Ajay as Varadarajan
Vivek as Sakthivel's brother-in-law
Saranya as Rajeswari, Sakthivel's mother
Vinoth Kishan as Vinoth, Sakthivel's brother
Santhanam as Balasubramaniam, Sakthivel's friend
Ravi Prakash as Divya's father
Cochin Haneefa as Chellapandi
K. P. A. C. Lalitha as Sakthivel's grandmother
Sathyan as Sakthivel's friend
Bala Singh as Maasilamani
Ravi Kale as Police Inspector
M. S. Bhaskar as Sub-Inspector
Manobala as Constable Muthusamy
Nellai Siva as Auto Driver
Devadarshini
Muthukaalai
Vimal as Sakthivel's friend (uncredited role)
Sudeepa Pinky as Sakthivel's younger sister
Meena Kumari as Mullai, Shakthivel's elder sister

Production 
The film was announced in September 2006 as a collaboration between producer Balaji and Ajith, and was to be co-produced by the Mumbai-based production company Adlabs. Vijay, a former assistant of Malayalam director Priyadarshan (who directed Hindi remake of 'Kireedam' Gardish, released in 1993) made his directorial debut with Kireedam after working as an ad film maker and chose to remake the 1989 film of the same name directed by Sibi Malayil and written by A. K. Lohithadas. Ajith Kumar was signed to appear in the lead role with Trisha, Rajkiran, Saranya and Vivek also a part of the cast, while the cinematographer was Tirru, music was composed by G. V. Prakash Kumar and the film was edited by Anthony. Vijay revealed that he "reworked about 80 per cent" from the original version. The film was briefly renamed Magudam, before being changed again.

The first schedule of shooting took place at Rajamundhry. In the 20 days schedule, some crucial scenes were shot on Ajith, which included a fight scene with Ajay Kumar who plays a rowdy here. Choreographed by stunt master Super Subbarayan, it had Ajith taking on Ajay and members of his gang. The second schedule continued in Chennai. A lavish set was erected by art director Selvakumar. A fight scene was shot here too between Ajith, Ajay Kumar and 20 stunt men who played Ajay’s henchmen. Ennore harbour was the venue of some more stunt scenes.

Release
The film released on 20 July 2007.

Marketing
A game was released about the film by Zapak Digital Entertainment Ltd to promote the film. In the game, the player has to help Shakti kill the gangsters while undergoing police training using different weapons. The player has to defend himself using different keys and approach the red cross to gain health. While doing this he can not let his father Rajaram catch him, which will bring the game to an end.

Reception
The film opened to positive reviews at the box office. The Hindu, in a review of Kireedam, said that "Vijay has neatly packaged a strong storyline with a sensibly balanced mix of sentiment and action. At no point does the film sag." It appreciated the lead and supporting cast: "Looking well-toned and incredibly youthful, Ajith makes a mark both with his appearance and expressions. And matching him equally in the two departments is an awesome Trisha." The review from an entertainment portal, Sify.com, hailed the attempt: "For once a Tamil remake of a Malayalam classic, lives up to our expectations. Kireedam is quality cinema, one that is daringly different from the run-of-the mill superstar films that are dished out in the name of mass movies." Sify.com added, "On the whole, Kireedam is an engaging entertainer which is so rare to find these days. Go for it!" A review from another movie portal, Behindwoods.com, gave it 3.5 out of 5 stars with the verdict "Complete family entertainer". It called the movie a "good realistic attempt towards meaningful cinema. But if the sluggish pace in the second half is taken care of, the movie would have been much crisper" and said that "Kreedom will categorically be Ajith's prized trophy in his film career." The film went on to win a single Filmfare award for Best Female Playback Singer for Sadhana Sargam's rendition of "Akkam Pakkam". Moreover, the film was nominated in four categories during the Vijay Awards for 2007, with Rajkiran, G. V. Prakash Kumar, Trisha and Sadhana Sargam being nominated in their respective categories.

The final scene in the film was changed after release from a sad to an upbeat ending after the producers felt that the original scene may keep audiences away. The film consequently went on to become a profitable venture at the box office.

Soundtrack 

The album consists of six tracks, five songs and a theme music track composed by G. V. Prakash Kumar. Dharan revealed that he had the opportunity to work for Kireedam but he could not take up the project as he was going through a tough phase then, suffering a personal loss in his family.

References

External links

Films shot in Tiruchirappalli
2007 films
Films set in Chennai
Films shot in Chennai
Films shot in Andhra Pradesh
Tamil remakes of Malayalam films
Films directed by A. L. Vijay
2007 directorial debut films
Films scored by G. V. Prakash Kumar
2000s Tamil-language films
Indian action drama films
2007 action drama films